Dumooa Tahseen (born on 25 February 1991) is an Iraqi singer, known for her Iraqi folk singing. She got her fame after winning The Voice: Ahla Sawt in the fourth season. She also sings in kurdish language.

Life
Tahseen was born in Baghdad to a family of Kurdish descent. She lived with her mother after her parents divorced. She began singing in the restaurants of Amman. She got her fame after her first appearance in The Voice: Ahla Sawt. She teamed up with Ahlam, reaching the final and winning the fourth season of the program.

References

1991 births
Living people
Musicians from Baghdad
21st-century Iraqi women singers
Iraqi Kurdish women
Iraqi emigrants to Jordan
The Voice (franchise) winners
Kurdish-language singers
Kurdish women singers
Arabic-language singers